The Bridgeport Indian Colony of California (lit. those who eat suckers), formerly known as the "Bridgeport Paiute Indian Colony of California", is a federally recognized tribe of Northern Paiute Indians in Mono County, California, United States.

Reservation

The Bridgeport Indian Colony has a federal reservation in Mono County, close to the Nevada border, in the unincorporated community of Bridgeport, California. The reservation is  large. Approximately fifty-five (55) Tribal Members live on the Colony, currently one hundred and five Tribal members (105) enrolled, and a registered population of 120 today. The reservation community consists of descendants from  Miwok, Mono, Paiute, Shoshone, and the Washoe tribes. The reservation site is near the southeast corner of Bridgeport Reservoir.

Language
The Bridgeport traditionally spoke the Northern Paiute language, which is part of the Western Numic branch of the Uto-Aztecan language family. Their dialect is sometimes called "Southern Nevada Northern Paiute." They used the Bridgeport writing system. There is currently a language project, held by University of California, Santa Cruz, dedicated to preserving and dedicating the Northern Paiute Language.

Education
The reservation is served by the Eastern Sierra Unified School District.

History
The Bridgeport Indian Colony was federally recognized on October 17, 1974.

Today
The tribe is governed by a five-person Tribal Council, who currently are as follows:

John Glazier, Tribal Chairman
Thomas Crawford, Vice-Chairman
Herb Glazier, Member-at-Large (on reservation)
David Rambeau, Member-at-Large (off reservation)
Art Sam, Secretary-Treasurer

References

Further reading
 Pritzker, Barry M. A Native American Encyclopedia: History, Culture, and Peoples. Oxford: Oxford University Press, 2000. .

External links
 Bridgeport Indian Colony Website
 https://web.archive.org/web/20100110062812/http://infodome.sdsu.edu/research/guides/calindians/calinddict.shtml#b
 http://paiute.ucsc.edu/

Northern Paiute
Native American tribes in California
Federally recognized tribes in the United States